Valley of the Dolls is a 1967 American drama film starring Barbara Parkins, Patty Duke, Sharon Tate, Susan Hayward, Paul Burke, and Lee Grant. It was directed by Mark Robson, and produced by David Weisbart. Based on Jacqueline Susann's 1966 novel Valley of the Dolls, it follows three women struggling to forge careers in the entertainment industry, each of them descending into barbiturate addiction—"dolls" being a slang term for depressant pills or "downers".

Though a box office success, Valley of the Dolls received largely negative reviews from critics upon release.

Plot

Recent Radcliffe graduate Anne Welles is hired as a secretary at a theatrical agency which represents Helen Lawson, a cutthroat Broadway diva. Helen fears newcomer Neely O'Hara will upstage her, so she has Anne's boss pressure Neely to quit their upcoming show. Anne sours on show business after seeing Helen's cruelty toward Neely, but her boss's business partner, Lyon Burke, dissuades her from quitting the agency.

Anne and Neely meet Jennifer North, a beautiful chorus girl with limited talent. They become fast friends, sharing the bonds of ambition and the tendency to fall in love with the wrong men.

After Lyon lands her an appearance on a telethon, Neely mounts a nightclub act. Buoyed by her overnight success, she moves to Hollywood to pursue a lucrative film career. Neely soon succumbs to alcoholism and abuse of the "dolls". She betrays her husband, Mel Anderson, by having an affair with fashion designer Ted Casablanca. After Mel leaves her, Neely divorces him and marries Ted. Neely's spiralling drug and alcohol use eventually sabotages her career and ends her second marriage.

Anne and Lyon start a romance, but Lyon resists Anne's wish to marry. When he abruptly leaves for England, Anne is distraught; she is further upset when her mother dies. Soon Anne's poise and natural beauty attract the attention of her boss's client, Kevin Gillmore, who hires her to promote his line of cosmetics in television and print ads. Kevin falls in love with Anne, but their relationship ends amicably when Anne realizes they are incompatible.

Jennifer follows Neely's path to Hollywood, where she marries nightclub singer Tony Polar. She becomes pregnant but gets an abortion after learning that Tony has the hereditary condition Huntington's chorea—a fact his domineering half-sister and manager Miriam had been concealing. When Tony's mental and physical health declines, Miriam and Jennifer place him in a sanitarium. Faced with Tony's mounting medical expenses, Jennifer makes French "art films" — soft-core pornography — to pay the bills. Thinking her body is her only currency, Jennifer commits suicide rather than face a mastectomy after learning she has breast cancer.

Neely's drug and alcohol abuse land her in the same sanitarium as Tony, where they discover each other when Neely begins singing in the common area and he joins her. After she is released, Lyon gets her a role in a Broadway play. Neely soon causes trouble by having an affair with Lyon and attending a press party for Helen Lawson. During a catfight in the ladies' room, Neely removes Helen's wig and throws it in the toilet. Lyon ends his relationship with Neely when she relapses and is replaced by her understudy. Neely continues her bender at a nearby bar and is left screaming and sobbing in a deserted alley when the bar closes.

Upset by Lyon's betrayal, Anne dabbles in "dolls" and almost drowns in the ocean while high. She returns to New England to live with her Aunt Amy. Lyon follows Anne to New England and asks her to marry him. She declines his offer and remains happily single and independent.

Cast

Production

Deviations from novel
The ending to the film was changed dramatically from the novel. In the film, Anne and Lyon never marry and do not have a child together. Rather, she leaves Lyon and returns to Lawrenceville, which is described as the one place she found real happiness. Lyon later visits her to propose but she refuses. These last-minute changes in the script, so out of keeping with Anne's established character (well-known to millions of readers), prompted original screenwriter Harlan Ellison, who wanted to keep the original downbeat ending, to remove his name and credit from the film.

Another important difference is that the film is clearly set in the mid-to-late 1960s and the events unfold over the course of a few years, whereas in the book the story begins in 1945 and develops throughout two decades.

Casting
Before filming on Valley of the Dolls started in early 1967, there was much publicity surrounding the casting of Judy Garland as Helen Lawson. Garland had not made a motion picture in five years. Her last film, I Could Go On Singing, was filmed in 1962 and released in March 1963. Despite decent reviews, it was a box-office failure. Shortly thereafter, Garland embarked on a weekly CBS television variety series, The Judy Garland Show, in the fall of 1963. Although it was favorably reviewed by the press, the ratings were low and was canceled in the spring of 1964. By 1967, Garland was thin, frail, in dire financial straits, and desperate for work. 20th Century Fox then signed her to appear as Helen Lawson in the film version of Valley of the Dolls. According to Gerold Frank, the author of the biography Judy, Garland was to receive $75,000 for eight weeks of work, then $25,000 a week if she was needed longer. This would also include her singing one song in the film. In March 1967, Garland flew to New York to attend the wedding of her daughter singer-dancer Liza Minnelli to Australian performer Peter Allen and to meet with the author of Valley of the Dolls, Jacqueline Susann, at a press conference to promote the upcoming film. In addition, both Garland and Susann appeared as the mystery guests on the CBS-TV game show What's My Line on Sunday, March 5 the same year, to further plug and publicize the film. Garland then returned to Hollywood to start work on the film. At first, all went well. Garland filmed some costume tests for the role and successfully pre-recorded the song "I'll Plant My Own Tree". However, after a week's shooting, she was unable to function and was heavily dependent not only on alcohol but also Demerol. Susann, who was cast in a bit part in the film and was sharing Garland's dressing room at the time, found the drug on the floor in her closet. As a result, with no footage deemed usable, Garland was fired by Fox. She begged them to give her another chance, but the studio refused. They did, however, agree to pay her half of her promised fee—$37,500—for her time. Garland was also given the copper-colored sequined pant suit designed by Travilla for the film which she wore during her final New York Palace Theatre engagement in August 1967.

Patty Duke told an audience at a screening of the film at the Castro Theater on July 20, 2009 that director Mark Robson made Garland wait from 8:00 am to 4:00 pm before filming her scenes for the day, knowing that she would be upset and drunk by that time. In her 1987 autobiography Call Me Anna, Duke felt that Garland had been deliberately exploited by the studio. She wrote: "The producers may have felt justified in hiring her in the first place... They had gotten their PR mileage out of the situation, the 'Judy comeback' stories had created extraordinary publicity for the film and now she was expendable". Academy Award winner Susan Hayward replaced Garland in the role. Hayward reportedly had a difficult relationship with the cast and crew, and her clashes with Duke became part of the dramatic tension between their characters.

20th Century Fox wanted contract star Raquel Welch to play Jennifer but she turned it down, not wanting to play a "sexpot" role. She asked to play Neely but the studio refused.

In January 1967, columnist Dorothy Manners reported that Oscar nominated actress Elizabeth Hartman had been cast in the role of Neely O'Hara, beating out some more famous Hollywood actresses. Hartman had allegedly made a successful screen test that "floored" director Mark Robson and producer David Weisbart, the former already enthralled with her performance in Francis Ford Coppola's You're a Big Boy Now. However, the following month, it was announced that Duke had signed on to play Neely instead, albeit against her agent's advice. Duke's universally panned "over the top" performance almost ruined her career.

Release
The film had its world premiere in Genoa, Italy, on November 16, 1967. Following the premiere, the press boarded the cruise ship Princess Italia for a screening on the way to the Canary Islands. The ship then headed to Miami where the US premiere took place on November 28. Further premieres took place along the route until the ship arrived in Los Angeles for a final premiere on December 14. It opened at the Criterion Theatre in New York City on December 15.

Box office
The film grossed $50 million worldwide against a $5 million budget. According to Fox records, the film needed to earn $9,700,000 in rentals to break even and made $22,925,000, meaning it made a profit, making it Fox's highest-grossing film at the time not to have a roadshow theatrical release. For seven weeks (Dec. 27, 1967—Feb. 13, 1968), Valley of the Dolls was the #1 most profitable motion picture in America.

Critical response
Review aggregation website Rotten Tomatoes has a 33% rating based on 39 reviews. The critical consensus reads: "Trashy, campy, soapy, and melodramatic, Valley of the Dolls may be a dud as a Hollywood expose, but has nonetheless endured as a kitsch classic". Leonard Maltin's "TV movies" gave the film a BOMB rating: "Scattered unintentional laughs do not compensate for terribly written, acted and directed adaptation of Jacqueline Susann's best-seller".

The film was included in the 1978 book The Fifty Worst Films of All Time (and How They Got That Way) by Harry Medved, Randy Dreyfuss, and Michael Medved.

Accolades

Home media
The Criterion Collection released Valley of the Dolls along with its parody Beyond the Valley of the Dolls in September 2016 on DVD and Blu-ray. While the latter film had previously been released by Arrow Films in the United Kingdom in the same year, this was the first Blu-ray release for Valley of the Dolls.

Soundtrack

Related works
Beyond the Valley of the Dolls, a 1970 satirical pastiche of Valley of the Dolls, was filmed by 20th Century Fox while the studio was being sued by Jacqueline Susann, according to Irving Mansfield's book Life with Jackie. Susann created the title for a Jean Holloway-scripted sequel that was rejected by the studio, which allowed Russ Meyer to film a radically different film with the same title. The suit went to court after Susann's death in 1974; the estate won damages of $2 million against Fox.

Two updated versions of the Jacqueline Susann novel were later broadcast as TV series:
 Jacqueline Susann's Valley of the Dolls (1981) starring Catherine Hicks, Lisa Hartman, Veronica Hamel and David Birney.
 Valley of the Dolls (1994) starring Sally Kirkland, Colleen Morris, Melissa De Sousa and Sharon Case.

Legacy
The film has developed a cult following, with critics and audiences citing its campy sensibility. The film is particularly celebrated by gay men for its campiness and has become part of the LGBT cultural canon.

See also
 List of American films of 1967

References

External links

 
 
 
 
 
 Valley of the Dolls: This Merry-Go-Round – an essay by Glenn Kenny at The Criterion Collection

1967 films
1967 drama films
1960s American films
1960s English-language films
20th Century Fox films
American drama films
Films à clef
Films about actors
Films based on American novels
Films directed by Mark Robson
Films scored by John Williams
Films set in Los Angeles
Films set in New York City
Films shot in Connecticut
Films shot in Los Angeles
Films shot in New York City